Răchițele may refer to:

 Răchițele, a village in Mărgău commune in Cluj County, Romania
 Răchițele de Jos, a village in Cocu commune in Argeș County, Romania
 Răchițele de Sus, a village in Cocu commune in Argeș County, Romania
 Valea Răchițele, an alternative name for the upper course of the river Săcuieu in Cluj County, Romania

See also 
 Răchita (disambiguation)
 Răchiți
 Răchitiș (disambiguation)
 Răchitova (disambiguation)
 Răchitoasa (disambiguation)